Sittiparus is a genus of birds in the tit family Paridae. The species in the genus were formerly included in Parus but were moved to Sittiparus when Parus was split into several resurrected genera following the publication of a detailed molecular phylogenetic analysis in 2013. The genus Sittiparus had originally been erected by the Belgium politician and naturalist Edmond de Sélys Longchamps in 1884 with the varied tit as the type species.

The genus contains the following species:

The subspecies Daito varied tit,  S. v. orii, became  extinct in the 1940s, the only tit to have done so.

References

Harrap and Quinn, Tits, Nuthatches and Treecreepers 

 
Bird genera
Poecile